The Villanderer Berg is a mountain in the Sarntal Alps in South Tyrol, Italy.

References 
 Hanspaul Menara: Südtiroler Gipfelwanderungen; Athesia; Bozen 2001.

External links 

Mountains of the Alps
Mountains of South Tyrol
Sarntal Alps